Thaisella forbesii is a species of sea snail, a marine gastropod mollusk, in the family Muricidae, the murex snails or rock snails.

Description
The length of the shell attains 38 mm.

Distribution
This species occurs off the Ivory Coast.

References

 Claremont, M., Williams, S. T., Barraclough, T. G. & Reid, D. G. (2011). The geographic scale of speciation in a marine snail with high dispersal potential. Journal of Biogeography. 38, 1016-1032
 Claremont, M., Vermeij, G. J., Williams, S. T. & Reid, D. G. (2013). Global phylogeny and new classification of the Rapaninae (Gastropoda: Muricidae), dominant molluscan predators on tropical rocky seashores. Molecular Phylogenetics and Evolution. 66: 91–102.

External links
 Dunker, W. (1853). Index molluscorum, quae in itinere ad Guineam inferiorem collegit Georgius Tams Med. Dr.. Cassel, Th. Fischer, vi + 74 pp., 10 pl
 Clench, W. J.; Turner, R. D. (1948). A new Thais from Angola and notes on Thais haemastoma Linné. American Museum Novitates. 1374: 1-4

forbesii
Gastropods described in 1853